Pi Tauri (π Tauri) is a solitary, yellow-hued star in the zodiac constellation of Taurus. With an apparent visual magnitude of +4.69, it is bright enough to be visible to the naked eye. Although it appears to lie among the stars of the Hyades cluster, it is not itself a member, being three times farther from Earth than the cluster. The distance to this star, as determined using an annual parallax shift of 7.83 mas as seen from the Earth, is around 420 light years. At that range, the visual magnitude of the star is diminished by an extinction factor of 0.24 due to interstellar dust.

At the estimated distance of Pi Tauri, this yields a physical size of about 21 times the radius of the Sun. It possesses nearly four times the mass of the Sun and is radiating 229 times the Sun's luminosity at an effective temperature of 5,086 K.

References

G-type giants
Tauri, Pi
Taurus (constellation)
Durchmusterung objects
Tauri, 073
028100
020732
1396